Dowzeyn (also Romanized as Dozeyn and Dozīn) is a village in Kuhsarat Rural District, in the Central District of Minudasht County, Golestan Province, Iran. At the 2006 census, its population was 4,971, in 1,046 families.
شهر دوزین واقع در استان گلستان منطقه ای کوهستانی بامردمانی کشاورز و دامدار

References 

Populated places in Minudasht County